Ridgewood is a historic apartment building located at 1703–1713 Ridge Avenue (at Church Street) in Evanston, Illinois. The Chicago architectural firm of Atchison & Edbrooke designed the building in 1905; while the firm was only active from 1904 to 1908, it designed several buildings in Evanston. The building has a Prairie School design, a popular residential style at the time that was nonetheless unusual for an apartment complex. The three-story brick building is shaped in a "U" and features half-octagonal bays at regular intervals. Six apartments are on each floor; each features Prairie woodwork, cabinets built into the walls, and a fireplace.

The building was added to the National Register of Historic Places on October 4, 1978.

References

Residential buildings on the National Register of Historic Places in Illinois
Prairie School architecture in Illinois
Residential buildings completed in 1905
Buildings and structures on the National Register of Historic Places in Cook County, Illinois
Buildings and structures in Evanston, Illinois
1905 establishments in Illinois